ARD is a joint organisation of Germany's regional public-service broadcasters. It was founded in 1950 in West Germany to represent the common interests of the new, decentralised, post-war broadcasting services – in particular the introduction of a joint television network.

The ARD has a budget of €6.9 billion, 22,612 employees and is the largest public broadcaster network in the world. The budget comes primarily from a licence fee which every household, company and public institution are required by law to pay. For an ordinary household the fee is currently €18.36 per month. Households living on welfare are exempt from the fee. The fees are not collected directly by the ARD, but by the Beitragsservice (formerly known as Gebühreneinzugszentrale GEZ), a common organisation of the ARD member broadcasters, the second public TV broadcaster ZDF, and Deutschlandradio.

ARD maintains and operates a national television network, called Das Erste ("The First") to differentiate it from ZDF, a.k.a. "das Zweite" ("The Second"), which started 1963, as a separate public TV-broadcaster. The ARD network began broadcasting on 31 October 1954 under the name of Deutsches Fernsehen ("German Television"), becoming Erstes Deutsches Fernsehen ("First German Television") with a corporate redesign in 1984; it adopted its current short name (Das Erste) in 1994. ARD's programmes are aired over its own terrestrial broadcast network, as well as via cable, satellite and IPTV.

ARD also produces two free-to-air channels (one and Tagesschau24) and participates in the production of Phoenix (current events, news and documentaries), KiKa (kids-oriented), 3sat (cultural-oriented), arte (Franco-German cultural programming), and Funk (teenage-oriented, online only).

ARD's programming is produced by its regional members (see also Institutions and member organizations) (Bayerischer Rundfunk (BR), Hessischer Rundfunk (HR), Mitteldeutscher Rundfunk (MDR), Norddeutscher Rundfunk (NDR), Radio Bremen, Rundfunk Berlin–Brandenburg (RBB), Saarländischer Rundfunk (SR), Südwestrundfunk (SWR) and Westdeutscher Rundfunk (WDR), which operate 54 regional and local radio stations and seven regional TV networks, some of which have opt outs at during the day. Deutsche Welle, Germany's international broadcaster, is also a member of ARD.

History

Name 

'Consortium' ("Working group")  – of the public-law broadcasting institutions‡ – of the Federal Republic of Germany'
‡public-law broadcasting institutions means broadcasters which are not privately owned and are not governmental radio or TV. ARD is not 'owned by' anybody, particularly not by "Germany" (meaning its government/federal state). ARD-members like BR (Bayerischer Rundfunk) are not owned by their Land (state and its government, here Bavaria), either. With the Rundfunkfreiheit (freedom of broadcasting), they have an independent position (within a legal framework).

1940s and 1950s

The winning Allies of World War II determined that German radio after World War II would not broadcast the same propaganda as the pre-war Reichs-Rundfunk-Gesellschaft ("Reich Broadcasting Company"). A federal structure, the renunciation of state influence and the avoidance of economic dependence were to be the key of the radio and TV institutions under public law (public radio and television organisations). The legal form of the new entity was Anstalt des öffentlichen Rechts ("Institution under Public Law"), a non-government and nonprofit organisation with its own administration under the control of two commissions, the Rundfunkrat (Broadcasting Council, responsible for the programmed content) and the Verwaltungsrat (Administration Council, responsible for management and infrastructure), in which different stakeholders from German public life were represented.

ARD's founding members were Nordwestdeutscher Rundfunk (NWDR), the station for the former British zone, Südwestfunk (SWF), the station in the French zone, and four stations located in the former American sector— Bayerischer Rundfunk (BR), Süddeutscher Rundfunk (SDR), Hessischer Rundfunk (HR), and Radio Bremen (RB).  The new entity was financed by an obligatory fee which every German household with at least one radio receiver paid. Each station received the money collected in its state. Larger ARD members subsidised smaller ones up to a certain extent.

In 1947, American military governor Lucius D. Clay declared diversity of public opinion as the main aim of post-war media policy. Individuals aligned with the post-war Allied forces in their respective sectors of Germany had a local influence on local regional broadcasters. NDR cites the influence of Hugh Greene on the early years of their organisation.

After the creation of individual broadcasting agencies for most German federal states these principles were further consolidated by Länder broadcasting laws, decisions of the Federal Constitutional Court (Bundesverfassungsgericht) and state treaties between the Länder. ARD members are thus (at least nominally) free of government influence and rely for only a small part of their income on advertising (1995: ten percent). They are financed mainly from licence fees from radio and TV owners, which are set through a complex political process. The mandated aim of the ARD corporations is not only to inform and to entertain, but also to encourage the integration of various parts of society and allow minorities a say in programming.

In the 1950s the ARD radio services became the major factor of the mass media system in West Germany. As early as 1952 the ARD radio stations had ten million listeners. However, the radio stations operated on a regional level, and it was only the development of a television umbrella that helped the ARD to establish itself nationwide. The broadcasting of a countrywide TV broadcast service was the goal of the ARD from the outset and the go-ahead for this was given at the end of 1952. The same year ARD was admitted as a full active member of the European Broadcasting Union and the "German sound archive", now German Broadcasting Archive (DRA, Deutsches Rundfunkarchiv), was established as a joint facility of the ARD.

In 1955 the founding member NWDR ("Nordwestdeutscher Rundfunk", English: "North-West German Broadcasting") split into today's NDR and WDR. The year before (1954) the smaller SFB was split off. The first daily news feature, the Tagesschau, went on the air from Hamburg in 1952. The famous 8:00 pm chime and announcement "" ("This is the first German television channel with the Tagesschau") remains an ARD hallmark today. The broadcast attracts an average of 8 million viewers.

1960s–1980s
After starting with a schedule of a mere two hours per-night, television became more widespread in Germany in the 1960s. Color broadcasts were introduced in 1967. Without competition from private broadcasters (other than the francophone Europe 1 and the multilingual RTL (Radio-Television Luxembourg) radio programs), the ARD stations made considerable progress in becoming modern and respected broadcasters. ZDF (Zweites Deutsches Fernsehen, Second German Television), a second public television broadcaster with centralized national organization structure, began its programming in 1963, but ARD would encounter no private competition in Germany until 1984. The ARD stations have also been a significant force in German politics; such investigative news magazines as Monitor and Panorama still reach millions of viewers every week. The environmental movement increased in popularity during the 1980s largely as a result of the disclosures made by ARD.

When private/commercial German-language broadcasters were admitted in  Germany by federal law in the mid-1980s, ARD television made subtle changes, adapting somewhat by producing programs oriented to a larger audience for their national networks and shifting many cultural and news programs to the regional networks and to newly created niche channels.

Informational television programs and the orientation of "Deutschlandfunk" (Germany's national public radio station, associated with, but not a member of the ARD) programs towards the GDR were of importance to the eventual collapse of the GDR.  Established in 1974, the ARD bureau in East Berlin made ARD television the most important source of information for GDR citizens, eighty percent of whom could watch what they referred to as "Westfernsehen". Notwithstanding obstruction on the part of GDR authorities and the repeated expulsion of their correspondents, the ARD-Tagesschau and Deutschlandfunk transmitted reports about the Leipzig Monday Demonstrations (which started on 4 September 1989) as early as September 1989.

1990s
After unification and the closure of the GDR television service, two new regional broadcasters were established in the East, becoming ARD members in 1992. These were originally the Mitteldeutscher Rundfunk (MDR, English: "Central German Broadcasting"), and Ostdeutscher Rundfunk Brandenburg (ORB, English: "East German Broadcasting Brandenburg"). The existing NDR service expanded into the north-east, where it also covered Mecklenburg-Vorpommern. The ORB service has since merged with the former Sender Freies Berlin (SFB, English "Radio Free Berlin") to become Rundfunk Berlin-Brandenburg (RBB, English: "Berlin-Brandenburg Broadcasting") in 2003.

Another merger took place between two member organisations of the ARD in 1998. The former Süddeutscher Rundfunk (SDR, English: "Southern German Broadcasting") and Südwestfunk (SWF, English: "Southwestcast") became Südwestrundfunk (SWR, English: "Southwest Broadcasting") on 1 October 1998.

Programming

Radio
Today, ARD member stations usually produce their own radio programming. Some ARD member stations usually collaborate for common radio services (an example being Nordwestradio, a culture-oriented radio station co-produced by Radio Bremen and NDR). Most ARD stations, however, will have at least a news-oriented radio station, a classical-music station, a youth-oriented station, and a cultural station. At night some stations will relay common night programming produced on a rota system by the ARD stations themselves. There are four common night programming services: Hitnacht (light music), Nachtkonzert (classical music), Infonacht (all news) and Popnacht (pop music). Most services are on the FM broadcast band, though some services are also available on DAB.

A similar network intended for national coverage is called Deutschlandradio, however Deutschlandradio is not an ARD member – instead Deutschlandradio is controlled by both ARD and ZDF. Deutschlandradio provides two terrestrial radio services: Deutschlandfunk (DLF), a news-oriented service, and Deutschlandfunk Kultur, a culture-oriented service. It also provides a science-orientated internet channel: 
Deutschlandfunk Nova.

ARD's best known radio station outside Germany is Deutsche Welle, which broadcasts its radio services around the world in many languages, mostly on analogue shortwave radio, online and FM partner stations. Deutsche Welle has no FM distribution in Germany.

"Archivradio" is an ARD internet radio station which streams raw audio material from German sound archives, mainly the ARD radio archives and the DRA. The program is accompanied by a web portal run by the ARD-member SWR, with background information of the original sounds aired.

Television
The main television channels of the ARD are the nationwide Das Erste and seven regional channels operated by the different regional broadcasting institutions. These channels were available on the analogue terrestrial transmitters until the shutdown of the analogue transmitters started in 2003. Das Erste and the third programmes, like the radio stations, are principally funded by licence fees, with a very limited amount of on-air advertising.

Das Erste broadcasts nationwide 24 hours a day, although the schedule does include four and a half hours of joint programming with ZDF each weekday, in the form of the news programmes Morgenmagazin (on air 5.30–9.00) and Mittagsmagazin (13.00–14.00), which the two organizations take weekly turns to produce.
Audience share (March 2008):12.5%, from 14 to 49 years 6.9%.

The regional members of ARD all, jointly (NDR/rb and SWR/SR) or separately, operate their own regional channels, known collectively as die Dritten ("the Third Programmes") – before recent rebranding, most of these stations had names like West 3 and Hessen 3. The schedules of these regional channels also include sub-regional opt-outs at certain times, in particular for local news.
BR Fernsehen from Bayerischer Rundfunk (sub-regional opt-outs: Altbayern und Schwaben (South), Franken (North))
hr-fernsehen from Hessischer Rundfunk
MDR Fernsehen from Mitteldeutscher Rundfunk (opt-outs: state programmes for Saxony, Sachsen-Anhalt, Thuringia)
NDR Fernsehen from Norddeutscher Rundfunk (opt-outs: state programmes for Lower Saxony, Schleswig-Holstein, Hamburg, Mecklenburg-Vorpommern and rb.tv from Radio Bremen)
RBB Fernsehen from Rundfunk Berlin-Brandenburg (opt-outs: separate state programmes)
SWR Fernsehen from Südwestrundfunk – in collaboration with SR Fernsehen (opt-outs: state programmes for Baden-Württemberg, Rhineland-Palatinate and SR Fernsehen from Saarländischer Rundfunk)
WDR Fernsehen from Westdeutscher Rundfunk. (11 local opt-outs within North Rhine-Westphalia)

ARD has two additional channels as part of their ARD Digital package:
Tagesschau24 – television news channel
One – entertainment television channel

ARD is also involved in several joint venture channels:
3sat with ZDF, ORF and SRG: a cultural channel
KI.KA with ZDF: a children's channel
Arte with ZDF and France Télévisions: a Franco-German cultural channel
Phoenix with ZDF: a news and documentary channel, focussed on showing press conferences and political debates in the German parliament live, in addition to historical and political features.

The international broadcaster Deutsche Welle also produces television services; however these services are mostly available via satellite.

Podcasts 
The Tagesschau, produced by the ARD on a nightly basis, is available on the ARD website as a podcast (available as audio-only or as audio and video). Other audio programs from the ARD's members (e.g., BR, MDR) and Deutsche Welle are available as podcasts, through their respective websites.

Institutions and member organizations 

ARD has 30 correspondents' offices in 26 countries.

ARD operates several other companies and institutions, sometimes jointly with ZDF: Degeto Film, a television rights trader and production company; the German Broadcasting Archive (DRA – Deutsches Rundfunkarchiv); the Institute for Broadcasting Technology (IRT – Institut für Rundfunktechnik), responsible for research and development; the Fee Collection Service (Beitragsservice), and others.

ARD is a supporter of the Hybrid Broadcast Broadband TV (HbbTV) initiative that is promoting and establishing an open European standard for hybrid set-top boxes for the reception of broadcast TV and broadband multimedia applications with a single user interface.

Chairs of the ARD

Logo

Criticism

Criticism by political parties 
Since it was founded in 2013, the German party AfD has accused the German broadcasters of being state-driven propaganda machines. This claim is heavily disputed. For example, a 2019 study from Oxford (p. 24) stated that the majority of the audience of German public broadcasters ARD, ZDF and "Deutschland Radio" are left-winged or left of the center of the political spectrum. The AfD took this to show that the broadcaster is biased and contributing to a left-shift in the political environment. The majority of German newspapers have responded that the AfD have misunderstood the Oxford study, and accused the AfD of spreading fake news. Another point of evidence offered is that ARD board member and Director for Programming Christine Strobl is not only a member of the CDU party herself, but also the daughter of Wolfgang Schäuble, a prominent CDU member of parliament. As Director for Programming she is in a position to stop or initiate the production of programs, but also potentially editorial decisions.

Neutrality
After the ARD withdrew material critical of the Turkish president Recep Tayyip Erdoğan, a journalist from the magazine Der Spiegel compared this behaviour in an opinion article to the Politburo of the Communist Party of the Soviet Union. To get rid of the "annoying image of state radio", the journalist recommends it would certainly be helpful to keep more distance from the government.

Framing manual 
Claudia Schwartz from the Neue Zürcher Zeitung reported in February 2019 the ARD wanted to impress upon its audience certain moral views. A manual from the "Berkeley International Framing Institute" (see sources below) was used internally in order to make ARD viewers consider their fees less as a compulsory contribution than as a kind of donation to a good cause. Claudia Schwartz commented: "Self-congratulation is in the best tradition of state radio."

But the website Netzpolitik.org (who published the original document), came to the conclusion that "Many of the proposed frames, which are currently heating the minds of many critics, have never been used in public by the public broadcasters representatives. This also shows that the excitement about the report is too high."

See also
 Television in Germany
 Zweites Deutsches Fernsehen (Second German TV channel)
 List of German-language television channels

Notes

References

Sources

External links 

  
 Official information about ARD in English (PDF document)
 Live ARD Radio
 ARD Radio Guide
 

 
Publicly funded broadcasters
Television networks in Germany
German-language television networks
Television stations in Germany
European Broadcasting Union members
1950 establishments in West Germany
Organizations established in 1950